Liberation Tower may refer to:

 Liberation Tower, Bessarabia 
 Liberation Tower, Kuwait 
 Liberation Tower, Dhaka